The Chrislea L.C.1 Airguard is a 1930s British two-seat cabin monoplane, designed by R.C. Christophorides and B V Leak, and built by Chrislea Aircraft Limited at Heston Aerodrome.

Development
The Airguard was designed as a training aircraft for the Civil Air Guard; it was a two-seat (side-by-side) low-wing cantilever monoplane, powered by a 62 hp Walter Mikron II inline piston engine.

Operational history
It was built in 1938, and registered G-AFIN After a time in private ownership, it was withdrawn from use and stored until the 1970s. It was re-built with a new fuselage, but it remains in private storage (2006), not having flown since World War II.

Specifications

References

Notes

Bibliography

1930s British civil utility aircraft
Airguard
Single-engined tractor aircraft
Low-wing aircraft
Aircraft first flown in 1938